Ippatsu Kanta-kun is a Japanese anime series created by Tatsunoko Productions in partnership with Topcraft. Along with Temple the Balloonist, it was one of the last works for which Tatsunoko co-founder Tatsuo Yoshida was credited as a creator; Yoshida died before the series began airing. The series was released in two DVD box sets in January 2010.

Plot
Kanta Tobase lives in the downtown with his mother, seven brothers and sisters, and the house dog. He is very enthusiastic about baseball. However, his mother never allows her children even to talk about baseball, not to speak of playing it since she believes that her husband died accidentally on account of baseball. As for Kanta, however, he continues play baseball secretly from early morning. One day he is asked by his friend to play as a substitute on a team. As Kanta completes a big play, he sees his mother standing there with a grim look. She tells Kanta not to play baseball ever again. But Kanta does not give up. As usual, he goes out to the field early next morning for practice. When his mother who is moved by Kanta's eagerness she decides to help Kanta and even proposes to organize a baseball team of their own.

Never released in English, the anime was a success on television in Italy (as Il fichissimo del baseball) and in Poland (as Baseballista).  It is also noteworthy for marking the directorial debut of then-Tatsunoko staffer and future Ghost in the Shell and Urusei Yatsura director Mamoru Oshii, as an episode director.

Cast

Chikako Akimoto as Ichiro
Kaneto Shiozawa as Jiro
Katsuji Mori as Fujita
Kazue Komiya as Shiro Tobase

References

External links
 

1977 anime television series debuts
Baseball in anime and manga
Comedy anime and manga
Fuji TV original programming
Tatsunoko Production
Topcraft